Kaunas Lutheran Holy Trinity Church is a Lutheran church in the Old Town of Kaunas, Lithuania. It is one of the first Lutheran churches in Kaunas, built in 1683. The wooden main altar dates from 1692. The church was closed by the Soviet authorities, nowadays it used by the local university.

References

Sources 

17th-century Lutheran churches
Lutheran churches in Kaunas